Ter Sámi is the easternmost of the Sámi languages. It was traditionally spoken in the northeastern part of the Kola Peninsula, but now it is an extinct language; in 2004, only ten speakers were left. By 2010, the number of speakers had decreased to two. In 2020, they were presumed dead or uncontactable. Other estimates counted about 30 Ter Sámi speakers in Murmansk oblast, as well as in St. Petersburg, in 2007. The mean age of the youngest Ter Sámi speakers at that time was 50.

History

In the end of the 19th century, there were six Ter Sámi villages in the eastern part of the Kola Peninsula, with a total population of approximately 450. In 2004, there were approximately 100 ethnic Ter Sámi of whom two elderly persons speak the language; the rest have shifted their language to Russian.

The rapid decline in the number of speakers was caused by Soviet collectivisation, during which its use was prohibited in schools and homes in the 1930s, and the largest Ter Sámi village, Yokanga, was declared "perspectiveless" and its inhabitants were forced to move to the Gremikha military base.

Phonology

Consonants 

 All consonants except for /j/ may be palatalized [ʲ].
 Consonants /t, d/ can also sound as half-palatalized.

Vowels 

 After palatalized consonants, /ɛ/ is realized as [e].

Documentation
There are no educational materials or facilities in Ter Sámi, and the language has no standardized orthography. The language is incompletely studied and documented, though text specimens and audio recordings as well as dictionaries for linguistic purposes exist.

Writing system 
A spelling system for Ter Sámi using the Latin alphabet and based on Skolt Sámi was developed in the 1930s. After the Second World War, this was replaced by a system using the Cyrillic alphabet, and based on Kildin Sámi. This system was used by the Sámi poet Oktyabrina Voronova.

Example of words in Ter Sámi

Grammar 
Ter saami has 8 cases, Nominative, Genitive, Accusative, Essive, Inessive-Lative, Dative-Illative, Abessive and Comitative.

Examples of the Genitive

(in the UPA)

abre' paл = raining cloud

pɛci̮ pal'čemi̮š = slaughter of deer

taja oлmi̮j = German inhabitant

tara parnɛ = Russian boys

Plurals

In the Nominative case the base word changes when a plural is made.

The word "ku", meaning: who, which in the cases.

Notes

External links

Ter saami dictionary
Die Struktur der Nominalphrase im Tersaamischen (in German)
Koltan- ja kuolanlapin sanakirja (dictionary in German, contains Ter Saami)
Koltan- ja kuolanlappalaisia satuja (texts in Kola Saami languages, includes Ter Saami)

Sámi in Russia
Eastern Sámi languages
Languages of Russia
Endangered Uralic languages
Endangered languages of Europe